Pansy is an unincorporated community in Harlan County, Kentucky, United States. It was also known as Gulston, which had its own post office.

References

Unincorporated communities in Harlan County, Kentucky
Unincorporated communities in Kentucky